Suzanne W. Tourtellotte (January 11, 1945 – June 20, 2013) was an American astronomer and discoverer of minor planets, a researcher at Yale University in the United States.

Biography
Tourtellotte graduated from MIT in 1966, and received an M.S. degree from Yale University in 1967. She continued to study for a Ph.D. in biochemistry from Princeton University in 1971.

From 1998, Tourtellote was the data manager at the Yale University department of astronomy for the YALO and SMARTS consortium.  She worked with Brad Schaefer on photometry of the moon Nereid. In 2003 together with David L. Rabinowitz, Brad and Martha Schaefer  she studied the solar phase curves and rotation states of Kuiper belt objects. In 2013; she worked on the La Silla Observatory Quest KBO survey 

Tourtellote was faculty member at Albertus Magnus College until 2008. She was a research scientist at the department of astronomy at Yale.

She died at the age of 68 in Hamden, Connecticut.

List of discovered minor planets 
Tourtellotte is credited by the Minor Planet Center with the co-discovery of 15 numbered minor planets made at the Chilean La Silla Observatory in 2010, in collaboration with astronomers David L. Rabinowitz and Megan E. Schwamb.

References

External links 
 Suzanne Tourtellotte affiliated papers on Research gate

1945 births
2013 deaths
American women astronomers
Discoverers of minor planets

Massachusetts Institute of Technology alumni
Yale University alumni
Princeton University alumni
Albertus Magnus College faculty